Hildegunn Mikkelsplass (born as Hildegunn Fossen on April 16, 1969 in Drammen) is a former Norwegian biathlete. She is married to the former cross-country skier Eilif Kristen Mikkelsplass.

References 
 
 

1969 births
Norwegian female biathletes
Olympic biathletes of Norway
Biathletes at the 1992 Winter Olympics
Biathletes at the 1994 Winter Olympics
Living people
Biathlon World Championships medalists
Sportspeople from Drammen
People from Sigdal
20th-century Norwegian women